The University of California, Santa Barbara (UCSB) campus is located around 10 miles west of downtown Santa Barbara in Santa Barbara County, California.

Overview

The University of California, Santa Barbara is located on cliffs directly above the Pacific Ocean. UCSB's campus is autonomous from local government and has not been annexed by the city of Santa Barbara. A parcel of the City of Santa Barbara that forms a strip of through the ocean to the Santa Barbara airport, runs through the west entrance to the university campus. UCSB has a Santa Barbara mailing address, as do other unincorporated areas around the city. The campuses surround the community of Isla Vista.

UCSB is one of a few universities in the United States with its own beach. The campus, bordered on three sides by the Pacific Ocean, has miles of coastline as well as its own lagoon. Goleta Point, also known as Campus Point, is a rocky extension into the ocean. The campus has numerous walking and bicycle paths across campus, around the lagoon and along the beach.

Much of the campus's early architecture was designed by architect William Pereira and his partner Charles Luckman, and made heavy use of custom tinted and patterned concrete block. This design element was carried over into many of the school's subsequent buildings. Many of the older campus buildings are being replaced with newer, more modern facilities.

The lagoon is a large body of water adjacent to the coastline, between San Rafael and San Miguel Residence Halls. It was created from a former tidal salt marsh flat and is fed by a combination of run-off and ocean water used by the Marine Science Building's aquatic life tanks; thus, it is a combination of fresh and salt water.

The UCSB Libraries, consisting of the Davidson Library and the Arts Library, hold more than 3 million bound volumes and millions of microforms, government documents, manuscripts, maps, satellite and aerial images, sound recordings, and other materials. The 24 Hour Study Room, formerly known as the RBR (Reserved Book Room), is adjacent to the Davidson Library, which is located in the middle of the UCSB campus.

Campbell Hall is the university's largest lecture hall with 862 seats. It is also the main venue for the UCSB Arts and Lectures series, which presents special performances, films, and lectures for the UCSB campus and Santa Barbara community.

The UCSB Family Vacation Center founded in 1969, is a summer family camp located on campus that draws over 2,000 guests each summer. The staff of over 50 includes many UCSB students who have been extensively trained as camp counselors.

Layout
The university is divided into two physical campuses, a West Campus and East Campus. The vast majority of university facilities, including all lecture halls and laboratories, are in the East Campus. The two campuses are connected by a large strip (known as the North and Storke Campuses) to the north which contain university housing and athletic fields. Thus, the university surrounds Isla Vista on three sides.

West Campus, aside from a few buildings dedicated to faculty housing, has largely been leased out to private organizations, and includes a school for the mentally disabled and a large nature preserve. The largest sand dunes on the south-facing coast of the Santa Barbara Channel are located here.

The East Campus centers around two quadrangles, separated from each other by the main library and bus circle, and the life sciences buildings. Along the western quad are Storke Plaza and buildings housing the various arts, social sciences, and humanities departments. The Student Resource Building and the Events Center are also located along this quad. Surrounding the wider, park-like eastern quad are buildings housing the physical sciences departments and the College of Engineering. Directly to the south of, but not adjacent to, the eastern quad are the life sciences and psychology departments, as well as most of the on-campus housing. The southernmost section of the campus is dominated by the lagoon. The peninsula extending from the beach into the lagoon contains an elaborate labyrinth.

Bicycles
UCSB is known for its extensive biking system. Bicycles have exclusive right of way on paths throughout East Campus. Bicycle stands and lockers are ubiquitous. UCSB is unique among bicycle-heavy areas in that most travel is done within a small radius.

Buildings and structures

Davidson Library

The Donald C. Davidson Library is named in honor of Donald C. Davidson, who served as University Librarian from 1947 to 1977. It is UCSB's main library, holding the general collection and several special collections: The Sciences and Engineering Library, the Map and Imagery Laboratory, the Curriculum Laboratory, the East Asian Library and the Ethnic and Gender Studies Library. The university's Department of Special Collections are also part of the Davidson Library. The Special Collections hold rare books and manuscripts and several collections, which include the Performing Arts Collection, the Wyles Collection on the American West, the Skofield Printers' Collection, and the California Ethnic and Multicultural Archives.

Storke Tower

Storke Tower is a landmark campanile (bell and clock tower) located in the centre of the UCSB campus. It can be seen from most places on campus, and it overlooks Storke Plaza. The bells range in size from 13 to 4,793 pounds, with the largest bell carrying the university seal and university motto.

Storke Tower is the tallest steel/cement structure in Santa Barbara County.

Ocean Science Education building

The new Ocean Science Education building will house the Outreach Center for Teaching Ocean Science (OCTOS) and incorporate the educational outreach program of UCSB's Marine Science Institute (MS) and the Channel Islands National Marine Sanctuary (CSMS)  OCTOS is designed to expand science education for kindergarten through 12th graders. It will also provide opportunities for undergraduate and graduate students, who will be voluntary guides, to learn about teaching science.

The project will cost an estimated $20 million, $8 million of which has already been provided by the federal government. The remaining $12 million will reportedly be made available through private funds raised by the university. The building was supposed to be completed in August 2011 but the university terminated their contract with their contractor because he was many months behind schedule and did not complete the building by the projected date. So at this time, the project remains unfinished.

References 

 
California, Santa Barbara